Alpha male and beta male, or simply put alpha and beta, are pseudoscientific terms for men derived from the designation for alpha and beta animals in ethology. They may also be used with other genders, such as women, or additionally use other letters of the Greek alphabet (such as sigma). The popularization of these terms to describe humans has been widely criticized by scientists.

Both terms have been frequently used in internet memes. The term beta is used as a pejorative self-identifier among members of the manosphere, particularly incels, who do not believe they are assertive or traditionally masculine, and feel overlooked by women. It is also used to negatively describe other men who are not deemed to be assertive, particularly with women.

History
The terms were used almost solely in animal ethology prior to the 1990s, particularly in regard to mating privileges with females, ability to hold territory, and hierarchy in terms of food consumption within their herd or flock. In animal ethology, beta refers to an animal who is subordinate to a higher-ranking members in the social hierarchy, thus having to wait to eat and having negligible or no opportunities for copulation.

In the 1982 book of Chimpanzee Politics: Power and Sex Among Apes, primatologist and ethologist Frans de Waal suggested that his observations of a chimpanzee colony could possibly be applied to human interactions. Some commentary on the book, including in the Chicago Tribune, discussed its parallels to human power hierarchies. In the early 1990s, some media outlets began to use the term alpha to refer to humans, specifically to "manly" men who excelled in business. Journalist Jesse Singal, writing in New York magazine, attributes the popular awareness of the terms to a 1999 Time magazine article, which described an opinion held by Naomi Wolf, who was at the time an advisor to then-presidential candidate Al Gore: "Wolf has argued internally that Gore is a 'Beta male' who needs to take on the 'Alpha male' in the Oval Office before the public will see him as the top dog." Singal also credits Neil Strauss's bestselling 2005 book on pickup artistry, titled The Game, for popularizing alpha male as an aspirational ideal.

Usage 
The view that there is a dominance hierarchy among humans consisting of "alpha males" and "beta males" is sometimes reported in the mainstream media. The term alpha male is often applied to any dominating man, especially bullies, despite the fact that dominating behaviour is rarely seen as a positive trait for either an ideal date or a romantic partner.  Claims about women being "hard-wired" to desire "alpha males" are seen by experts as misogynistic and stereotypical, and are not supported by research. Evolutionary psychologists who study human mating behaviour instead believe that humans use two distinct strategies –– dominance and prestige –– for climbing social hierarchies, and that prestige plays a significantly more important role in establishing men's attractiveness to women than does dominance. As cognitive scientists Scott Barry Kaufman summarizes: Taken together, the research suggests that the ideal man (for a date or romantic partner) is one who is assertive, confident, easygoing, and sensitive, without being aggressive, demanding, dominant, quiet, shy, or submissive. In other words, a prestigious man, not a dominant man. In fact, it appears that the prestigious man who is high in both assertiveness and kindness is considered the most attractive to women for both short-term affairs and long-term relationships. Misconceptions about "alpha males" are common within the manosphere, a collection of websites, blogs, and online forums promoting masculinity, strong opposition to feminism, and misogyny which includes movements such as the men's rights movement, incels (involuntary celibates), Men Going Their Own Way (MGTOW), pick-up artists (PUA), and fathers' rights groups. 

The term beta is also often used among manosphere communities to refer to men they consider easily taken advantage of or ignored by women. Its usage is inconsistent; media studies scholar Debbie Ging has described the communities' theories about "alpha, beta, omega, and zeta masculinity" as "confused and contradictory". Beta is sometimes used as self-identifier among men who do not embody hegemonic masculinity. It is also sometimes used by manospherians as a pejorative term for men who are or are perceived to be feminist, or who are thought to be acting as a "". Some manosphere groups refer to members of other groups in the manosphere as betas; for example, members of the MGTOW community sometimes use it to refer to men's rights activists or incels. Members of the pickup artist (PUA) communities use it to refer to men who cannot seduce women. Similar terms used by the manosphere communities include nice guy, cuck, and soy boy.

Related terms

"Alpha fux beta bux" 
In the manosphere, the term alpha fux beta bux presupposes a sexual strategy of hypergamy or "marrying up" among women whereby they prefer and have sex with "alpha" males, but settle for less attractive "beta" males for financial reasons. Sometimes it expresses a belief that women marry beta males to exploit them financially, while continuing to have extramarital sex with alpha males. Ging explains these beliefs as an effort by young men in the Western world to cope with their limited economic prospects following the 2007–2008 financial crisis by appealing to gender-essentialist notions of gold-digging women popular in postfeminist culture.

Beta orbiter 
A beta orbiter is a beta male who invests time and effort into mingling with women in the hope of eventually getting into a romantic relationship or having sex with them. The term earned some media attention in 2019 with the murder of Bianca Devins. A man killed the 17-year-old Devins and posted photographs of her body online, one of which bore the caption, "sorry fuckers, you're going to have to find somebody else to orbit."

Beta uprising 
The term beta uprising or incel rebellion has been used largely among incels to refer to revenge by members of their community who have been overlooked by women. It is also sometimes used to describe a movement to overthrow what they view as an oppressive, feminist society. A 2018 vehicle-ramming attack in Toronto, Canada, was allegedly perpetrated by a man who had posted on his Facebook page just prior to the attack, "the Incel Rebellion has already begun". Media outlets have used the terms beta uprising and incel rebellion to refer to acts of violence perpetrated by members of manosphere communities, particularly incels.

Sigma male 
Sigma male is used to denote a male who is equally dominant to an alpha male, but exists outside the alpha-beta male hierarchy as a "lone wolf". In the manosphere, it is regarded as the "rarest" kind of male. The term first appeared in a blog post by alt-right provocateur Vox Day. In 2018, the term appeared on YouTube and in 2021 it went viral.

Despite its alt-right origins, the term sigma male has taken on an ironic and satirical meaning, often mocking the concept of the "manosphere" and the ideas of hustle culture with bizarre and nonsensical actions being considered part of the sigma male mindset or "grindset".

See also
 
 Toxic masculinity
 Internet slang
 Chad (slang)
 Neckbeard (slang)
 Omegaverse

References

2010s slang
2020s slang
Internet culture
Manosphere
Masculinity
Stereotypes of men